This event was held on 29 January 2017 as part of the 2017 UCI Cyclo-cross World Championships in Belvaux, Luxembourg. Participants must be men born in 1994 or before. It was won by Wout van Aert of Belgium.

Race report
Wout van Aert and Mathieu van der Poel were the big favourites before the race, having dominated the whole season and dividing the majority of races between them.

In contrast to the previous races, snow and ice were much less and the track had become much more muddy and therefore slower. As a result, several rocks surfaced which were barely visible and often covered in small pools of water. The race would turn out to become tough on the material, with especially flat tyres playing a deciding role.

Just after the start, Belgian Tom Meeusen broke his bicycle at the first obstacle and was forced to retire immediately. Meanwhile, van der Poel immediately raced away from the pack with only Kevin Pauwels able to follow. A chase group involved van Aert, Tim Merlier, Michael Vanthourenhout, Corné van Kessel, Stan Godrie, Clément Venturini and Lars van der Haar already 15 seconds back after the first lap. A puncture by Pauwels caused him to drop back, leaving van der Poel going solo from lap two. In the chasing group several riders also suffered multiple punctures and dropped back, with only van Aert able to remain about ten seconds behind.

Van der Poel suffered successive punctures on laps 2, 3 and 4 but each time closely before the pit lane, not losing much time but allowing van Aert to close the gap each lap, finally getting back together on lap 4. Behind the two leaders the gap kept widening, however the first chaser changed often as punctures caused many riders to drop back from a good position. Several riders suffered several punctures and some riders even dropped out of the race as they ran out of spare tyres, including 2008 World Champion Lars Boom.

The two leaders remained together until lap 6 when disaster struck for van der Poel as he suffered a puncture a long distance from the pits, causing him to lose 30 seconds on van Aert. Van Aert now only needed to avoid punctures in the last three laps to win his second consecutive world title, in which he succeeded. As the other riders were already over a minute back, van der Poel had no problem securing second but was visibly disappointed with his second place and eventually finished in tears 44 seconds behind van Aert.

In the fight for third, over two minutes behind van Aert, Pauwels was able to overtake van der Haar on the final lap to take his fifth bronze medal at the UCI Cyclo-cross World Championships following earlier third places in 2011, 2012, 2014 and 2016.

Results

Fastest laps

Overall

By lap

References

Men's elite race
UCI Cyclo-cross World Championships – Men's elite race